Michel Simplício Rosseto (born 26 March 1986 in São Paulo) is a Brazilian professional footballer who plays as a forward.

Honours
Campeonato Catarinense: 2006
Kuwait Emir Cup: 2013

External links

1986 births
Living people
Footballers from São Paulo
Brazilian footballers
Association football forwards
Campeonato Brasileiro Série A players
Campeonato Brasileiro Série B players
União Bandeirante Futebol Clube players
Figueirense FC players
Associação Atlética Ponte Preta players
Grêmio Esportivo Brasil players
Primeira Liga players
Liga Portugal 2 players
Associação Naval 1º de Maio players
Qadsia SC players
UAE First Division League players
Khor Fakkan Sports Club players
Brazilian expatriate footballers
Expatriate footballers in Portugal
Expatriate footballers in Kuwait
Expatriate footballers in the United Arab Emirates
Brazilian expatriate sportspeople in Portugal
Brazilian expatriate sportspeople in Kuwait